REV is a removable hard disk storage system from Iomega.

The small removable disks store 35, 70, or 120 gigabytes (GB) and are hard-drive technology. Like a standard hard drive, the REV system uses a flying head to read and write data to a spinning platter. The removable disks contained the platter, spindle, and motor, while the drive heads and drive controller are contained within the REV drive. The drives allow for data transfer rates of about 25 megabytes (MB) per second.

The REV was available as an external desktop model with FireWire, SCSI or USB 2.0 interfaces, an internal model with SCSI, ATAPI, or SATA interfaces, or an external server model which features a cartridge autoloader and SCSI interface. Iomega also offered a 320 GB network-attached storage appliance which features a built-in REV. The drives are compatible with Macintosh, Windows, and Linux operating systems, although some only with particular models or interfaces.

This product, especially the server model, was marketed as a replacement of tape drive technology for enterprise data backup, with claims of higher reliability, greater speed, and random access capability. 

The REV was in many ways a successor to Iomega's Jaz drive, which uses a similar removable hard-disk-platter concept. However the Jaz design does not put the drive motor in the disk case. In some circles, REV drives are referred to as "RRD," for "Removable Rigid Disk," because SCSI REV drives identify themselves as "RRD" drives to the host OS.

The disks are formatted with the UDF file system on Windows and Unix/Linux.  On Apple systems, they may be formatted as HFS+ or UDF in Mac OS X.

A seemingly-similar competing technology is RDX Technology.  A key distinction, however, is that the REV drive heads and drive controller remain inside the drive when the hard-disk platter is removed from it.  In RDX Technology, the drive heads are contained within the cartridge along with the platter and are removed along with it.

The drives suffer from poor reliability and high failure rates of both the disk mechanism and power supply units (on the external versions). Faced with cheaper, smaller, higher capacity and more reliable USB 2.5" portable hard drives, the REV format was discontinued:

35 GB - August 31, 2009
70 GB - December 14, 2009
120 GB - January 25, 2010

See also 
 Castlewood Orb Drive
 Universal Disk Format

References 

 "Iomega Introduces REV 120GB Backup Drive"
 "Iomega Debuts Versatile Backup Drive: 35GB Rev Provides Removable Storage Inside a Protective Cartridge"
 "sourceforge.net IOM RRD Tools" 

Hard disk drives
Iomega storage devices